Shanthamma was an Indian actress in the Kannada film industry, as well as in Hindi and Tamil, and a theatre artist in Karnataka, India. She was known for playing supporting and character roles.

Personal life
Shanthamma couldn't pursue her acting interests during her initial days at home. Her husband was a dance teacher in Gokak company and upon his encouragement she started acting in films. Their family stayed in Madras for 15 years.

Career
Shanthamma made her debut in 1956 in the Kannada film industry with the movie Hari Bhakta. She acted in more than 400 films in her career, including television soaps/serials. The last film she acted in was Endendigu (2015).

Selected filmography
Hari Bhakta (1956)
Ranadheera Kanteerava (1960)
Kaiwara Mahathme (1961)
Kaamana Billu
Indina Bharatha (1984)
Rupayi Raja
Bombay Dada (1991)
Sabarimale
Aakasmika (1993)...Rajeeva
Chinnari Mutha (1993)
Karulina Koogu (1994)
Doni Sagali (1998)
Kallarali Hoovagi (2006)

See also

List of people from Karnataka
Cinema of Karnataka
List of Indian film actresses
Cinema of India

References

External links

Actresses in Kannada cinema
Kannada people
Actresses from Karnataka
Actresses from Bangalore
Indian film actresses
20th-century Indian actresses
21st-century Indian actresses
Actresses in Kannada television
Actresses in Kannada theatre
2020 deaths